Robert Louthan (born 1951) is an American poet.

Life
Louthan graduated from Goddard College in 1978 with a Master of Fine Arts degree.

His work has appeared in The American Poetry Review, Antioch Review, The Paris Review, and Ploughshares.

Awards
 1978 Grolier Poetry Prize
 Bread Loaf Transatlantic Review scholarship

Works

Anthologies

References

External links
 "Photographs from the American Poetry Review Records, 1971-1998: Ms. Coll. 349", University of Pennsylvania

1951 births
Living people
American male poets
Goddard College alumni